Ahmad Bustomi (born 13 July 1985) is an Indonesian professional footballer who plays as a midfielder for Liga 1 club Arema. He is one of the 2007 Sea Games team member Ivan Kolev upbringing. His favourite players are Bima Sakti and Andrea Pirlo. He made his national team debut in a friendly match against Uruguay on October 8, 2010.

International goals
Ahmad Bustomi: International under-23 goals

Honours

Club
Arema 
 Indonesia Super League: 2009–10
 East Java Governor Cup: 2013
 Indonesian Inter Island Cup: 2014/15
 Indonesia President's Cup: 2017

International
Indonesia
AFF Championship runner-up: 2010

References

External links
 

1985 births
Living people
Javanese people
Indonesian footballers
Indonesia international footballers
Arema F.C. players
Persema Malang players
Mitra Kukar players
People from Jombang Regency
Association football midfielders
Liga 1 (Indonesia) players
Footballers at the 2006 Asian Games
Asian Games competitors for Indonesia
Sportspeople from East Java